Gladys Willems (born 4 January 1977 in Schoten, Belgium) is a Belgian compound archer. She has competed at the major World Archery Federation competitions, the World Cup, winning stage medals, and the World Archery Championships, winning a gold medal at the indoor championships. She set a world record of 149 for a 15-arrow round in 2011, a record which stood until broken by Sara Lopez's first ever perfect round of 150 in 2013, and a FITA round world record of 1411 in 2007 in Lausanne. The highest world ranking she has achieved is 4, in 2007.

References

1977 births
Living people
Belgian female archers
People from Schoten
Sportspeople from Antwerp Province